Chestnut Hills was an unincorporated community in Wake County, North Carolina, United States, which is now within the city limits of Raleigh. It lies at an elevation of 348 feet (106 m). It was begun in the early 1950s and was one of North Raleigh's original suburbs, preceding North Hills and North Hills Estates, although the total area is now referred to as North Hills, part of Midtown.

References

Populated places in Wake County, North Carolina
Unincorporated communities in North Carolina
Populated places established in the 1950s